Sportsklubben Djerv 1919 is an association football club located in Haugesund, Norway, established in 1919. The first team plays in the 3. divisjon, the fourth tier of Norwegian football, after being promoted from the 4. divisjon in 2018.

History
The club was founded on 26 March 1919. The year 1919 was added to the club name to distinguish the club from SK Djerv from Bergen. Djerv 1919 reached the semi-finals of the 1986 Norwegian Cup where they lost 1-0 to Tromsø. The team played its only season in the top division in 1988. In 1993, it merged its elite teams with Haugar to create FK Haugesund, but kept on playing in the lower leagues. In 2018, the team was promoted to the fourth tier of Norwegian  football.

Recent seasons
{|class="wikitable"
|-bgcolor="#efefef"
! Season
!
! Pos.
! Pl.
! W
! D
! L
! GS
! GA
! P
!Cup
!Notes
!Ref.
|-
|2013 
|4. divisjon
|align=right|3
|align=right|22||align=right|13||align=right|2||align=right|7
|align=right|86||align=right|34||align=right|41
|First qualifying round
|
|
|-
|2014 
|4. divisjon
|align=right|2
|align=right|22||align=right|19||align=right|1||align=right|2
|align=right|86||align=right|27||align=right|58
|Second qualifying round
|
|
|-
|2015 
|4. divisjon
|align=right|4
|align=right|22||align=right|12||align=right|6||align=right|4
|align=right|71||align=right|37||align=right|42
|First qualifying round
|
|
|-
|2016 
|4. divisjon
|align=right|2
|align=right|22||align=right|13||align=right|5||align=right|4
|align=right|53||align=right|27||align=right|44
|
|
|
|-
|2017 
|4. divisjon
|align=right|8
|align=right|26||align=right|9||align=right|7||align=right|10
|align=right|60||align=right|46||align=right|34
|First qualifying round
|
|
|-
|2018 
|4. divisjon
|align=right bgcolor=#DDFFDD| 1
|align=right|26||align=right|19||align=right|6||align=right|1
|align=right|92||align=right|37||align=right|63
|dnq
|Promoted to 3. divisjon
|
|-
|2019 
|3. divisjon
|align=right|3
|align=right|26||align=right|16||align=right|3||align=right|7
|align=right|72||align=right|38||align=right|51
|First qualifying round
|
|
|}

References

Football clubs in Norway
Eliteserien clubs
SK Djerv 1919
Association football clubs established in 1919
SK Djerv 1919